The Lardil people, who prefer to be known as Kunhanaamendaa (meaning people of Kunhanhaa, the traditional name for Mornington Island), are an Aboriginal Australian people and the traditional custodians of Mornington Island in the Wellesley Islands chain in the Gulf of Carpentaria, Queensland.

Language

Lardil, now moribund, belongs to the Tangkic language family. The feature of kinship-sensitive pronominal prefixes had been ignored until they were discovered by Kenneth L. Hale in a study of Lardil. A special second language, Damin thought of as a tongue created by the Yellow Trevally fish ancestor Kaltharr, and devised in part to mimic 'fish talk'  was taught during the second degree of initiation (warama). This initiation register of specialized Lardil has fascinated linguists: it contained in its phonemic repertoire two types of airstream initiation, a pulmonic ingressive (l*) and a labiovelar lingual egressive (p'), unique among the world's languages. The secret language reinscribed in what looks like an indigenous form of semantic analysis the entire Lardil vocabulary into 200 words and has been described by Hale as a 'monument to the human intellect'. Since Damin was a language involving rituals disapproved of by the missionaries, it disappeared with the outlawing and suppression of the Lardil ritual cycles.

Ecology and lifestyle
Rockwall fish traps (derndernim) were constructed off the coast to catch varieties of fish as the tides receded. The Lardil had a meticulous ethnobotanical knowledge and David McKnight has argued that "their botanical taxonomy is of the same intellectual order as our botanical scientific taxonomy".

People raised within the mission, once detached from the hunter and gatherer lifestyle of the traditional community, were considered good workers to recruit for the pastoral stations, where they were employed as drovers and ringers. Once the mission was closed, the elderly once more regained some control. However the Landil people who had spent their mature years on the mainland as farm workers had no traditional background for raising children to draw on. The result was that the generation of children raised from the 1960s onwards had no grasp of either the old or new work technologies and ethics.

Christian mission

With the exception of Sweers Island, all the Wellesley Islands were set aside as an Aboriginal reserve. Generally, once Aboriginal resistance to the take-over of their lands was broken, they were concentrated in reserves and missions. Presbyterian missionaries were granted permission to establish a mission on Mornington Island, and one was duly built in 1914. A mission was established on Mornington Island by the Rev. Robert Hall, his wife and two assistants, Mr and Mrs Owen, and Hall strove to institute economic self-sufficiency for the islanders' economy, having an all-native crew manning the ketch, while organising the harvesting and curing of trepang. Their initial presence, according to one account, was received positively by the Lardil people. Hall was speared and killed in 1917 by a Lardil man, "Burketown Peter/Bad Peter" a respected drover based in Burketown, who ran into trouble, often standing up for his rights, and wanted to kill a cattle station owner with whom he fell out, but was dissuaded from doing so and told by Ganggalida people to return to his home country after refusing to obey local demands that he move back to the mainland.

Dormitory system
Hall was succeeded by the Rev. Wilson, who imposed a dormitory system, segregating children from their elders and thus breaking the chain of tradition through which tribal lore and law was transmitted. The older generations were normally left to their own devices as missionaries concentrated on separating them from their children, and concentrating their efforts on the youngest: aside from religious indoctrination, sexual and marriage customs were challenged, and subject to control. Few of the Lardil girls brought up in the dormitory married according to the traditional kinship rules, given that the mission head played an influential role as intermediary. The dormitory system was discontinued in 1954.

Self-government
The population of the island is no longer exclusively Lardil, after several tribal groups, among them the Kaiadilt, were relocated by missionaries from Bentinck Island.

The Mornington Island Mission was substituted by a community administration in 1978. The Shire council in the 1970s introduced a beer canteen, government developmental funds were seen as allowing one to dispense with the necessity to work, and, as alcoholism spread, the Mornington Island peoples began to rank among the communities with the highest rate of suicide in Australia. Interpersonal violence was common, including domestic violence; a few young white women have formed relationships with island youths and moved to the island, to find that their boyfriend's behaviour changed and their anticipated idyll close to nature did not materialize. "They usually departed after their first "proper good hiding" and invariably by the second".

Mornington Island, with its schools, churches, libraries and hospitals, is often presented as a model community to outsiders. However, by 2003 its society and its people had been devastated by alcohol. In the early 2000s the community was declared "dry" and importation of alcohol was forbidden. By 2021 dangerous amounts of strong home-brewed alcoholic drink and of "sly grog" (smuggled alcoholic drink) were being consumed, and petrol sniffing was common. Diets were poor, consisting mainly of imported heavily-processed foods; Save the Children were trying to combat malnutrition among children, and among adults diabetes and renal failure were common. Average life expectancy was 53, twenty years shorter than Australians generally. A local councillor said that "Prohibition on Mornington Island has become part of the problem instead of the solution" and the council was considering reopening a tavern.

Alternative names
 Kunhanaamendaa, as the people themselves prefer to be called, meaning the people of Kunhanhaa; they refer to the language only as Lardil.

According to Tindale:
 Lardi:i (typo)
 Laierdila
 Ladil
 Kunana (name for Mornington Island)
 Kuna'na
 Gunana
 Mornington Island tribe
 Kare-wa (dialect name according to Walter Roth)

Notable people
 Dick Roughsey

Notes

Citations

Sources

Aboriginal peoples of Queensland